Green Bank may refer to:
 Green bank, a financial institution that invests in clean energy
 Green Bank (Philippines), rural bank in the Caraga region, Philippines
 Green Bank (Texas), commercial bank in Texas
 Green Bank, Cumbria, place in England
 Green Bank, New Jersey, an unincorporated community
 Green Bank, West Virginia, community in Pocahontas County, West Virginia, USA
 Green Bank Telescope, radio telescope at Green Bank, West Virginia
 Green Bank equation, result in exobiology
 GreenBank, a bank in Greeneville, Tennessee, USA, acquired by North American Financial Holdings

See also
 Ethical banking, a bank concerned with the social and environmental impacts of its investments and loans
 Greenbank (disambiguation)
 UK Green Investment Bank, an environmental funding institution of the UK government